Mexico and its member station Televisa, participated in the OTI festival 26 times making its debut in 1973, one year after the start of the contest. During the contest’s run, Mexico was one of the most successful nations with a record six wins, including a back-to-back victory in 1989 and 1990, and 14 top 3 finishes.

History 
Mexico was along with Spain the most successful country of the history of the festival with six victories. Apart from the victories, the country ended in the top 10 on 19 occasions.

The first Mexican victory came in 1973 in Belo Horizonte with Imelda Miller who sung the song "¡Que alegre va María!" (How happy goes Mary!!). Two year later, the country won again the contest in San Juan with the song "La felicidad" (The happiness) sung by Gualberto Castro. One decade later, México won again the contest with the folk singer Eugenia León, who sung "El fandango aquí" (The fandango is here) in a very controversial victory, which was attributed to the solidarity with the country because of the 1985 Mexico City earthquake, that destroyed the capital city.

In 1989 and 1990 Mexico got two consecutive wins with the singer "Analí" and "Carlos Cuevas". The last Mexican victory came in 1997 in Lima, Perú with the song "Se diga lo que se diga" (Whatever it's said).

Mexico hosted the OTI festival 6 times, the first one in the Ruiz de Alarcón theatre of Acapulco. In 1981 and 1984 the festival was held in the national capital, being the gigantic National Auditorium the venue. In 1991, Acapulco hosted again the festival in the Convention Centre of the tourist city, the same venue where the last edition of the contest was held.

National final 

The Mexican OTI Song Contest trajectory is known for its popular national final, the "National OTI Contest", which was passionately followed every year by the Mexican audience and known by its surprises and frequent scandals.  This selection process is usually compared with its Swedish Eurovision counterpart, the Melodifestivalen due to the interest that it created and the big names who tried to represent México in the main OTI Festival.

Contestants 

Table key

References